Georgi Atanasov  (Bulgarian: Георги Атанасов; born March 6, 2004) is a footballer who currently plays for Arda Kardzhali. Born in Canada, he represents Bulgaria at youth international level.

Career

Club
In January 2021, Atanasov left the youth side of Levski Sofia and signed a first team contract with Arda Kardzhali. He made his professional debut on February 27 as a substitute for Rumen Rumenov in a 3–2 defeat to Slavia Sofia. In July 2022 Atanasov was loaned to Second League side Sportist Svoge.

International
Eligible for Canada and Bulgaria, Atanasov has represented the latter at youth level.

In May 2022 Atanasov was named to the 60-man provisional Canadian U-20 team for the 2022 CONCACAF U-20 Championship.

References

External links 

Living people
2004 births
Bulgarian footballers
Bulgaria youth international footballers
Association football wingers
FC Arda Kardzhali players
FC Sportist Svoge players